Cyril Vasiľ S.J. (born 10 April 1965) is a Slovak Jesuit, eparchial Bishop of Slovak Catholic Eparchy of Košice and Archbishop ad personam, who has been a prelate of the Slovak Greek Catholic Church since Pope Francis named him Apostolic Administrator of the Slovak Catholic Eparchy of Košice on 20 January 2020. He has been professor and Rector of the Pontifical Oriental Institute, a titular archbishop from 2009 to 2021, and Secretary of the Congregation for the Oriental Churches from 2009 to 2020.

Biography
Vasiľ was born in Košice, Slovakia, on 10 April 1965. From 1982 to 1987 he attended the Faculty of Theology of Cyril and Methodius in Bratislava. He was ordained priest for the Slovak Greek Catholic Church in 1987. In 1989 he obtained the licentiate in canon law at the Pontifical Oriental Institute in Rome. On 15 October 1990 he entered the Society of Jesus and in 2001 made his solemn profession. In 1994 he obtained a doctorate in Eastern Canon Law at the Pontifical Oriental Institute.

In 2002 he was elected Dean and pro-rector of the Faculty of Eastern Canon Law at the Pontifical Oriental Institute; in May 2007 he was selected rector. He was the first member of the Slovak Greek Catholic Church to hold that post.

He was a Consultor to the Congregation for the Oriental Churches, the Congregation for the Doctrine of the Faith, and the Pontifical Council for the Pastoral Care of Migrants and Itinerants. He was appointed an expert to the 2005 Synod of Bishops on the Eucharist. He was also a professor in the Pontifical Gregorian University, the Theological Faculty of the University of Bratislava and the University of Trnava. In 2003 he was appointed Spiritual Director of the Union Internationale des Guides et Scouts d′Europe. He served as Spiritual Director of this traditional faith-based scouting organization until 2007.

On 7 May 2009, Pope Benedict XVI appointed him Titular Archbishop of Ptolemais in Libya and Secretary of the Congregation for the Oriental Churches. He received his episcopal consecration on 14 June 2009 from Slavomir Miklovš, Bishop Emeritus of Križevci, Croatia.

On 21 January 2010 he was named a consultor to the Pontifical Council for Promoting Christian Unity.

On 20 January 2020, he was named Apostolic administrator sede plena of the Slovak Catholic Eparchy of Košice, following a private audience with Pope Francis on 18 January. After bishop Milan Chautur resigned, on 24 June 2021 Pope Francis named him second eparchial bishop of Eparchy of Košice, but allowed him to use title Archbishop. 

He is the author of numerous books and articles and has worked with Vatican Radio.

References

1965 births
Living people
Clergy from Košice
Slovak Jesuits
Canonical theologians
People associated with Scouting
Slovak Eastern Catholics
Slovak Greek Catholic bishops
Officials of the Roman Curia
21st-century Eastern Catholic bishops
Pontifical Oriental Institute alumni
Academic staff of the Pontifical Oriental Institute
Members of the Congregation for the Oriental Churches
Roman Catholic titular archbishops
Jesuit archbishops